"Motley Crew" is a song by American rapper and singer Post Malone, released on July 9, 2021, through Republic Records. The song marked his first solo release in almost two years.

Background 
Post Malone's manager Dre London previewed "Motley Crew" on July 4, 2021, to celebrate American Independence Day, and Post's birthday.

Music video
The video was shot at Auto Club Speedway in Fontana, California, and thus features a racing motif with cameo appearances by NASCAR drivers Denny Hamlin and Bubba Wallace. The video also features drummer Tommy Lee, who drives Malone around the track in a custom convertible. Lee's band, Mötley Crüe, serve as the song's titular inspiration. The video also features cameos from Malone's previous collaborators, including Saint Jhn, Tyla Yaweh, Tyga, Ty Dolla Sign, Big Sean and French Montana. Rapper Pressa, singer Baby Santana, and Malone's manager Dre London all make appearances as well. The video was directed by Cole Bennett.

Charts

Weekly charts

Year-end charts

References

External links
  

2021 singles
2021 songs
Post Malone songs
Songs written by Post Malone
Songs written by D.A. Got That Dope
Songs written by Louis Bell
Song recordings produced by Louis Bell